The following is a list of hormones found in Homo sapiens.  Spelling is not uniform for many hormones. For example, current North American and international usage uses  estrogen and gonadotropin, while British usage retains the Greek digraph in oestrogen and favours the earlier spelling gonadotrophin.

Hormone listing

Steroid

References 

Human hormones
Cell signaling
Signal transduction